Vilém Wünsche (1 December 1900 in Šenov – 3 May 1984 in Šenov) was a Czech painter, graphic artist and illustrator. The topics of his art are mainly connected with the theme of Ostrava and the local life of afflicted miners.

In 1922, he studied at the School of Applied Arts in Prague and in 1923–1930 was a pupil at the Academy of Fine Arts. His son Otakar is a member of Communist Party of Bohemia and Moravia and a former town representative of Šenov.

See also
List of Czech painters

References

Czech graphic designers
Czech illustrators
1900 births
1984 deaths
People from Šenov
20th-century Czech painters
Czech male painters
20th-century Czech male artists